Arthur Ingram (? - 1742) served as a member of Parliament for Horsham.

Background 
He was the son of Arthur Ingram (died 1693) of Borrowby by Jane Mallory, daughter of Sir John Mallory of Studley, Yorkshire. He married Elizabeth Barns, by whom he had one daughter.

Office 
He was appointed for Horsham by petition from his relatives, the Ingram Viscounts of Irvine, in whose interest he voted consistently. He served from 16 June 1715 to 1722. He was commissioner for forfeited estates from 1716 to 1725.

Footnotes

References 

1742 deaths
Members of the Parliament of Great Britain for English constituencies
Ingram, Arthur (died 1742)